The 2007 Yazidi communities bombings occurred on August 14, 2007, when four coordinated suicide car bomb attacks detonated in the Yazidi towns of Til Ezer (al-Qahtaniyah) and Siba Sheikh Khidir (al-Jazirah), in northern Iraq.

There were 796 people killed and at least 1,500 others wounded, making it the Iraq War's deadliest car bomb attack. It is also the fourth deadliest act of terrorism in history, after September 11 attacks in the United States, the Camp Speicher massacre in Iraq, and the Mai Kadra massacre of the Amhara people in Ethiopia. No group claimed responsibility for the attack.

Tensions and background 

For several months leading up to the attack, tensions had been building up in the area, particularly between Yazidis and Sunni Muslims (both Arabs and Kurds). Some Yazidis living in the area received threatening letters calling them "infidels". Leaflets were also distributed denouncing Yazidis as "anti-Islamic" and warning them that an attack was imminent.

The attack was possibly connected with the murder of Du'a Khalil Aswad, a 17-year-old Yazidi girl, who was stoned to death by fellow Yazidis four months earlier. Aswad was believed to have wanted to convert in order to marry a Sunni. Two weeks later, after a video of the stoning appeared on the Internet, Sunni gunmen stopped minibuses filled with Yazidis; 23 Yazidi men were forced from a bus and shot dead.

The Sinjar area, which has a mixed population of Yazidis, Kurds, Turkmen and Arabs, was scheduled to vote in a plebiscite on accession to the Kurdistan Region in December 2007. This caused hostility among the neighbouring Arab communities. A force of 600 Kurdish Peshmerga was subsequently deployed in the area, and ditches were dug around Yazidi villages to prevent further attacks.

Details 
The bombings occurred at around 7:20 pm on August 14, 2007, when four co-ordinated suicide bomb attacks detonated in the Yazidi towns of Qahtaniyah and Jazeera (Siba Sheikh Khidir), near Mosul, Nineveh Governorate, northern Iraq. They targeted the Yazidis, a religious minority in Iraq, using a fuel tanker and three cars. An Iraqi Interior Ministry spokesman said that two tons of explosives were used in the blasts, which crumbled buildings, trapping entire families beneath mud bricks and other wreckage as entire neighborhoods were flattened. Rescuers dug underneath the destroyed buildings by hand to search for remaining survivors.

"Hospitals here are running out of medicine. The pharmacies are empty. We need food, medicine and water otherwise there will be an even greater catastrophe," said Abdul-Rahim al-Shimari, mayor of the Baaj district, which includes the devastated villages.

There were 796 people killed and at least 1,562 more wounded.

Responsibility 
No group claimed responsibility for the attack. Iraq's President, Jalal Talabani, accused Iraqi Sunni insurgents of the bombings, pointing at the history of Sunni violence against Yazidis. They were reported to have distributed leaflets denouncing Yazidis as "anti-Islamic". Although the attacks carry al-Qaeda's signature of multiple simultaneous attacks, it is unclear why they would refrain from claiming responsibility for such a successful operation. "We're looking at Al-Qaeda as the prime suspect," said Lieutenant Colonel Christopher Garver, a United States military spokesman.

On September 3, 2007, the U.S. military reportedly killed the suspected mastermind of the bombings, Abu Mohammed al-Afri.

See also 

Genocide of Yazidis by ISIL
Sinjar massacre
List of Yazidi settlements
List of 2007 suicide bombings in Iraq
List of deadliest terrorist attacks

References

2007 murders in Iraq
21st century in Nineveh Governorate
21st-century mass murder in Iraq
Attacks on buildings and structures in 2007
August 2007 crimes
August 2007 events in Asia
Building bombings in Iraq
Crime in Nineveh Governorate
Islamic terrorist incidents in 2007
Mass murder in 2007
2007 communities bombings
Suicide bombings in 2007
Suicide car and truck bombings in Iraq
Terrorist attacks attributed to al-Qaeda in Iraq
Terrorist incidents in Iraq in 2007